The 1975–76 Minnesota North Stars season was the North Stars' ninth season.

Coached by Ted Harris, the team compiled a record of 20–53–7 for 47 points, to finish the regular season 4th in the Smythe Division and failed to qualify for the playoffs.

Offseason

Regular season

Final standings

Schedule and results

Playoffs

Player statistics

Awards and records

Transactions

Draft picks
Minnesota's draft picks at the 1975 NHL Amateur Draft held in Montreal, Quebec.

Farm teams

See also
1975–76 NHL season

References

External links

Minnesota North Stars seasons
Minnesota North Stars
Minnesota North Stars
Minnesota North Stars
Minnesota North Stars